José Luis Naranjo y Quintana (born 26 August 1944) is a Mexican politician affiliated with the Party of the Democratic Revolution. As of 2014 he served as Deputy of the LIX Legislature of the Mexican Congress representing the State of Mexico.

References

1944 births
Living people
Politicians from the State of Mexico
Party of the Democratic Revolution politicians
Deputies of the LIX Legislature of Mexico
Members of the Chamber of Deputies (Mexico) for the State of Mexico